Saranaca is a genus of ichneumon wasps in the family Ichneumonidae.

Species
There are four species in Saranaca:
 Saranaca apicalis (Cresson, 1877)
 Saranaca atra (Hopper, 1939)
 Saranaca elegans (Cresson, 1868)
 Saranaca floridana (Heinrich, 1962)

References

External links

 

Parasitic wasps
Ichneumoninae
Ichneumonidae genera